Mokrousovo is the name of several rural localities in Russia:
Mokrousovo, Republic of Bashkortostan, a village in Iskinsky Selsoviet of Ufa, the Republic of Bashkortostan
Mokrousovo, Kemerovo Oblast, a village in Sidorovskaya Rural Territory of Novokuznetsky District of Kemerovo Oblast
Mokrousovo, Kurgan Oblast, a selo in Mokrousovsky Selsoviet of Mokrousovsky District of Kurgan Oblast
Mokrousovo, Kursk Oblast, a village in Podovsky Selsoviet of Khomutovsky District of Kursk Oblast
Mokrousovo, Yaroslavl Oblast, a village in Chebakovsky Rural Okrug of Tutayevsky District of Yaroslavl Oblast